Wilson Claude Chouest Jr. (born December 2, 1951) is an American criminal known for the murders of two women, one of whom remains unidentified, in the state of California, both occurring within days of each other in July 1980. He has a history of violence toward women, including abduction, robbery and rape, which occurred between 1977 and 1980. Chouest, who is currently serving a life sentence, was charged with three counts of murder, including that of one victim's unborn son. He was identified as a suspect in the case in 2012, after his DNA was matched to fingernail scrapings collected from both victims.

Chouest is also known to have committed crimes in the Tulare and Los Angeles counties. He is currently serving life in prison for his activities in the latter area. On May 31, 2018, a jury found Chouest guilty of the murders of the women, but did not convict on behalf of the Ventura County victim's unborn son.

Victims

One of Chouest's known victims, "Kern County Jane Doe", was unidentified for many years, but was identified as Shirley Ann Soosay on April 23, 2021. The victims were found in neighboring counties in California, Kern and Ventura, in July 1980. He had been released from prison a month before. The women were described as being well-groomed and had no known arrests in the state, as their fingerprints did not match any on file. DNA and dental records were also obtained but have since failed to identify either. Chouest has refused to give any information about the slayings. After one of the murders, Chouest allegedly told Patrick Scott Bell about killing a woman. Bell and his brothers then assisted Chouest with cleaning the vehicle he had used. When confronted by their mother, Carolyn Bell, one of the brothers "reacted strongly" and claimed Chouest had struck and killed a deer. Carolyn did not inform the police about this incident until her questioning in 2013.

Shirley Ann Soosay

The body of a White, Native American, or Hispanic woman was located on July 15, 1980, in Delano, Kern County, in an almond orchard. Tire tracks were observed at the scene. She was murdered approximately one day prior; she was stabbed 29 times and was then transported to the location she was found. The woman was possibly picked up from a now-closed bar known as "Ruby's" that was located in Lemoore. Along with DNA recovered from the woman's fingernails and clothing, Chouest was also linked to a bottle of Michelob beer found near the body.

She had two unique tattoos; one was a heart containing the words "I Love You," "Shirley" and "Seattle" and another that read "Mother" and "I Love You." She also had scars on her abdomen and buttock. She had also worn a leg prosthesis, believed to have been the result of an injury that had occurred on her upper leg. All of her upper teeth were missing. She was intoxicated at the time of her murder, as her blood alcohol was .3 %

The words on the tattoos suggested evidence to where she may have been native to, such as Seattle, Washington, and likely had the name Shirley or was close to someone who bore that name. However, it was also believed that she may have gone by the name of "Rebecca Ochoa" or "Becky" and was employed at an apple orchard. The woman was known to have been in the area for several weeks before she died. The victim was twenty-five to thirty-five years old at an estimated height and weight of five feet four inches and 115 pounds, respectively. It is also believed she had given birth at least once. She wore a pink top, jeans, white shoes and blue socks. 

In 2018 the DNA Doe Project took on her case. In 2020, Violet Soosay, a niece of the decedent, came across a Facebook post made by the DDP which centered difficulty their volunteers were having in tracing an Indigenous decedent's lineage, due to a lack of ethnic data in DNA databases. Violet Soosay sent samples of her own DNA in for comparison. In April 2021, she was identified as Shirley Ann Soosay of the Samson Cree Nation in Alberta, Canada. Soosay is believed to be one of the first Indigenous unidentified decedents identified through forensic genealogy.

Shirley Soosay had fallen out of contact with her family in 1979. In her life, Soosay had been known for her love of travelling. Before her disappearance, Soosay had talked of visiting a friend in Seattle. Soosay's last known residence had been in British Columbia, and because of that, search efforts by family members were focused primarily there. Following her identification, Soosay's remains were returned to her family in Alberta.

Ventura County Jane Doe

The body of a female aged fifteen to thirty was discovered lying in a high school parking lot on July 18, 1980, in Westlake, Ventura County, California. The victim had died within twelve hours of her discovery and was likely murdered at a different location. She had been dragged to where she was found, leaving a trail of blood. After the suspect was identified in the case, it was released that the woman may have possibly been kidnapped in one of the four California counties—Tulare, Kern, Ventura, and Los Angeles—Chouest frequented at the time.

She was estimated to be between five feet one and five feet three inches tall at a weight of 110 to 115 pounds. She was five months pregnant with a boy. The woman was stabbed 16 times and strangled to death after she was raped. She had brown eyes, black hair with bleached ends, and penciled eyebrows; the hairs had been shaved. The victim also had pierced ears and had a large amount of dental maintenance. DNA testing indicated the victim was primarily Native American with some Hispanic, Caucasian, Sub Saharan and Asian ancestry.

The victim had several scars and birthmarks: a pair of scars from vaccinations were present on her left arm and a scar on the left knee. She was clothed in a white shirt, underwear, a black bra, and red pants. 

The victim's unborn son appeared to have been well-nourished and "adequate" prenatal care had taken place. She had given birth at least once before and had an episiotomy scar. Paternal DNA from her son did not match any known offenders in the CODIS database. The DNA match to Chouest was made in 2012. In 2018, the DNA Doe Project took on the task of identifying her at the request of law enforcement. The organization identified a third cousin of the victim through a genealogy website. In 2020, a new reconstruction was released by the NCMEC.

In November 2021, the unborn son's father was located. He was unable to provide any new information on her identity.

Rape victims

Chouest attacked a woman in Los Angeles in 1977 and he committed two additional rapes in August and September 1980. 

The 1977 attack occurred on October 12 when he offered his victim a ride to Topanga Canyon. He had removed the handles on the inside of the passenger area, in preparation for her attempt to escape. Once she was inside, he exposed himself and propositioned her for sex, threatening her with a knife. The woman offered her compliance and Chouest disposed of the weapon. She was later bound and driven to a hillside, where he raped her. She was then strangled and kicked until she lost consciousness, yet she survived. Before he left the scene, he had stolen some of her clothing and her purse. He was later convicted of robbery and kidnapping; the rape charge was dropped due to a plea agreement.

The attack in August 1980 was less successful. Chouest, wielding a knife, approached a woman in Visalia, California, who was leaving the College of the Sequoias, yet she refused to cooperate, declining to enter his vehicle. The woman gave her attacker her wallet and escaped once he became aware of two bystanders nearby. Her wallet contained her personal and contact information, and she received a telephone call regarding her money the next day from a man believed to be Chouest. 

By September, he abducted a third woman at the same college campus with a knife. He succeeded with taking her into his vehicle, where he robbed and bound her. Driving to a cornfield, he raped her. After the woman brought up her husband, Chouest drove her back to where he kidnapped her and apologized.

Chouest was convicted of these rapes and was serving a life sentence at the time he was linked to his unidentified victims.

Trial

Following his arrest in 2015, Chouest was tried in May 2018. Three of Chouest's surviving victims testified about the attacks that they experienced. Carolyn and Patrick Bell also testified. Chouest's attorney, public defender Andre Nintcheff, argued that his client's DNA did not prove he was at the crime scene and also stated that the victims consented to sexual activity. 

The jury returned with guilty verdicts for the adult victims. They were unable to convict him of the murder of the fetus, as prosecutors referenced laws in place at the time of the killings, despite those laws being changed in 1994. The death penalty would not be pursued due to the age and lack of witnesses testifying on his behalf. He was given the highest eligible sentence; two life terms with no parole with four additional years. Chouest is currently incarcerated in the California Substance Abuse Treatment Facility and State Prison, Corcoran.

Media

In May 2022, the murders of Shirley Soosay and Ventura County Jane Doe were featured on a Cold Case Files episode. The Hulu original docuseries Web of Death profiled the case in January 2023.

References

1951 births
1970s in California
20th-century American criminals
American male criminals
American people convicted of assault
American people convicted of kidnapping
American people convicted of murder
American people convicted of rape
American people convicted of robbery
American murderers of children
American prisoners sentenced to life imprisonment
American rapists
Criminals from California
Criminals from Los Angeles
History of Kern County, California
History of Ventura County, California
Living people
People convicted of murder by California
People from New Orleans
Prisoners sentenced to life imprisonment by California
Suspected serial killers
Violence against women in the United States